Marciel is both a given name and a surname. Notable people with the name include:

Marciel Rodger Back (born 1982), Brazilian footballer
Marciel Silva da Silva (born 1995), Brazilian footballer
Scot Marciel (born 1958), American diplomat

See also
Marcel (given name)